

Certs was a breath mint (or, according to some, a candy mint) manufactured by Mondelēz International, and it was one of America's most popular mints for decades. Certs was the first breath/candy mint to be nationally marketed in the United States, and has been a fixture at American drug stores and convenience stores since its debut on the market in 1956. It was discontinued in 2018, possibly for having partially hydrogenated cottonseed oil, which is not allowed as an ingredient in food sold in the USA since then.

Description
Certs were classified as mints, but they actually containd no oils of any mint plant. Instead, as has long been advertised, the mints contain "Retsyn," a trademarked name for a mixture of copper gluconate, partially hydrogenated cottonseed oil, and flavoring. It is the copper gluconate in Retsyn which gives Certs its signature green flecks.

Certs were not a true disks, but exhibits a pronounced bulge emerging from the edge, subsiding to form a depression at the center. Certs were not always this shape. Prior to the current form, they were more regular discs with beveled edges. Each Certs was embossed on one side with the legend "CERTS RETSYN" in letters about 3 mm tall, approximately midway between center and edge, each letter oriented away from the center.

Variations
Cadbury-Adams also manufactures Certs Powerful Mints, available in peppermint, spearmint and wintergreen. Certs Powerful Mints are small, Tic-Tac-like mints. They are described by the manufacturer as a "breath-freshening mint" rather than simply a "breath mint," one of the two descriptions used for standard Certs.

Cadbury-Adams also offers Certs Cool Mint Drops, described as a "breath drop." These medium sized oval-shaped mints are available in flavors named Cinnamint, Freshmint, and Peppermint. Certs Cool Mint Drops are packaged in slide top paper boxes and feature a liquid center which is claimed to be "intensely flavorful."

At the end of 2014, Mondelēz International stopped the production of the Classic Fruit flavor in Canada. A Facebook page was created to keep the discontinued product in stores.

Certs advertising
In the 1960s and 1970s, Certs was heavily advertised on American television with a famous campaign featuring two attractive young people earnestly arguing over the proper classification of the mints. The one participant would assert, "It’s a breath mint!" The other would assay a rebuttal by stating, "It’s a candy mint!" This taxonomic dilemma would finally be resolved by the unseen announcer, who would achieve synthesis by explaining that Certs was "Two, two, two mints in one!" Saturday Night Live lampooned the ads with a fictitious product called "Shimmer", with Gilda Radner's argument "It's a floor wax!" vs. Dan Aykroyd's "It's a dessert topping, you cow!" being resolved by announcer Chevy Chase's declaration that "New Shimmer's a floor wax and a dessert topping!". Indeed, the phrase "Two, two, two [insert almost any word or short phrase here] in one" remained an American idiomatic expression into the 21st century..

In 1999, the United States Customs Service classified Certs as a candy mint for tariff purposes, since candy was taxed differently from oral hygiene products. In the ensuing suit before the United States Court of International Trade, Cadbury introduced expert testimony that Certs stimulate the flow of saliva, thus flushing bad odors from the mouth, and that its flavors and oils mask bad breath. But the court ruled that, since Certs did not contain anti-bacterial ingredients, they were, indeed, simply a candy mint. This ruling was, however, overturned at the Court of Appeals for the Federal Circuit, making Certs legally a breath mint.

See also
List of breath mints

References

External links
Cadbury-Adams web site

Breath mints
American confectionery
Products introduced in 1956
Cadbury Adams brands
Mondelez International brands